Howrah–Ernakulam Antyodaya Express is an express train of the Indian Railways connecting  in Kolkata and   in Kochi. It is currently being operated with 22877/22878 train numbers on a weekly basis. It has been a lifeline for the migrant workers from Eastern India. Thousands of workers use this train to travel from West Bengal and Odisha to the industrial cities in Kerala, Tamil Nadu and Andhra Pradesh.

Coach composition 

The trains is completely general coaches trains designed by Indian Railways with features of LED screen display to show information about stations, train speed etc. Vending machines for tea, coffee and milk, bio toilets in compartments as well as CCTV cameras as well as facility for potable drinking water and mobile charging points and toilet occupancy indicators.

Service

It averages 63 km/hr as 22877 Antyodaya Express starts on Saturday and covering 2285 km in 37 hrs & 59 km/hr as 22878 Antyodaya Express starts on Tuesday covering 1968 km in 38 hrs 15 mins.

This train serves one of the busiest corridor of migrant laborers movement in India. That is from Eastern India to Southern Indian cities of Kochi, Thrissur, Palakkad, Coimbatore, Ongole, Vijayawada, Eluru, Rajahmundry, Vijaynagaram etc.

Route & halts

 Howrah
 
 
 
 
 
 
 
 
 
 
 
 
 
 
 
 
 
 
 
 
 
 
 
 
 Ernakulam Junction

Loco link

Both trains are hauled by a  / Tatanagar-based WAP-7 electric locomotives.

Operation

22877 – leaves Howrah Junction on Saturday and reaches Ernakulam Junction on day 3 at morning 6:00 hrs IST

22878 – leaves Ernakulam Junction every Tuesday at 00:20 hrs IST in night and reach Howrah Junction on 2nd day at 14:50 hrs IST

See also 

 Antyodaya Express

 Howrah–Yesvantpur Humsafar Express

Notes

References

External links
22877/Howrah - Ernakulam Antyodaya Express India Rail Info
22878/Ernakulam - Howrah Antyodaya Express India Rail Info

Antyodaya Express trains
Rail transport in Kerala
Rail transport in West Bengal
Rail transport in Odisha
Rail transport in Andhra Pradesh
Rail transport in Tamil Nadu
Rail transport in Karnataka
2017 establishments in India
Trains from Howrah Junction railway station
Rail transport in Howrah
Transport in Kochi
Railway services introduced in 2017